Gwyneth Anjuli Keyworth (born 15 September 1990) is a Welsh actress. She was born in Aberystwyth and began acting in a local Welsh language youth theatre group. She went on to appear with the National Youth Theatre.

Since graduating from the Royal Academy of Dramatic Art, she is perhaps best known for her roles on British TV programmes, including Misfits and The Great Outdoors. She has had film roles, including the 2012 cannibal horror thriller Elfie Hopkins and the 2014 comedy-drama Closer to the Moon. She has also appeared in stage shows, including the 2015 Shakespeare's Globe production of Helen Edmundson's The Heresy of Love and a production of Little Shop of Horrors. In 2014, she starred in The Vodka Diaries as Periel and, in 2015, she played Clea in Season 5 of the HBO series Game of Thrones.

In 2022 she stars as Scout in a production of To Kill a Mockingbird at the Gielgud Theatre in London. Her portrayal of Scout led her to winning the Best Supporting Performer in a play at the 2023 WhatsOnStage awards.

Filmography

Television

Film

References

External links
 
 CV at agent's

1990 births
Alumni of RADA
Living people
People educated at Ysgol Gyfun Gymunedol Penweddig
People from Aberystwyth
Welsh television actresses
Welsh film actresses
Welsh-speaking actors
21st-century Welsh actresses